Harlem is a station on the 'L' system, serving the Blue Line's Forest Park branch in Forest Park, Illinois. The station was built with an auxiliary entrance at Circle Avenue that was eventually converted to an single turnstile facility. The Circle Avenue entrance reopened as an auxiliary entrance/exit on September 26, 2009, at 4 PM. To the south of the station is the Ferrara Candy Company (formerly Ferrara Pan [the "Pan" part of the name was dropped in 2012.) A Roos chest-making factory was located west of the station and Circle Avenue until it was torn down in 2013 to make way for a new recreation park that opened there in 2018. The Roos company closed for good in 1951.

Harlem opened in 1960 and is composed of a main entrance on Harlem Avenue and an auxiliary entrance on Circle Avenue, providing access to the station's platform. Harlem is open 24/7 365 days a year as part of the overnight service of the Blue Line and an annual total of 346,005 passengers have boarded the station in 2012. The station is not to be confused with the Blue Line's other station on Harlem Avenue that is located on the Kennedy Expressway portion of the line connections.

History

Wisconsin Avenue station (AE&C, 1902–1905)
The Aurora Elgin and Chicago Railway (AE&C) began service on August 25, 1902, and opened a station on Wisconsin Avenue by October. The Garfield Park branch, opened by the Metropolitan West Side Elevated Railroad in 1895, abutted the AE&C's line and took over local service in the area on March 11, 1905. Rather than continue using the Wisconsin Avenue station, the Metropolitan decided to open two stations in the vicinity, one at Harlem and the other at Home Avenue.

Garfield Park station (1905–1958)
The Garfield Park branch continued until it was replaced by the Congress Line in 1958.

Blue Line station (1960–present)
The current Blue Line Harlem station opened in 1960.

Bus Connections 
Pace
 307 Harlem

See also
Harlem (CTA Blue Line O'Hare branch station)
Harlem (CTA Green Line station)

Notes and references

Notes

References

External links

Harlem (Congress Line) Station Page
Circle Avenue entrance from Google Maps Street View
Harlem Avenue entrance from Google Maps Street View

CTA Blue Line stations
Railway stations in the United States opened in 1960
Forest Park, Illinois
1960 establishments in Illinois